Ebenezer Knowlton Fogg (October 24, 1837 – April 21, 1900) was an American shoe retailer and politician, who served as a member of the Massachusetts House of Representatives, and as a member of the Common Council, Board of Aldermen and as the 24th Mayor of Lynn, Massachusetts.

Early life
Fogg was born on October 24, 1837, in Norwood, Massachusetts to Jeremiah Fogg and Abigail (Hill) Fogg.

Postmaster of Lynn
Fogg was the Postmaster of Lynn, Massachusetts from June 1, 1898, until his death on April 21, 1900.

References

Bibliography
 Cutter, William Richard.: Genealogical and Personal Memoirs Relating to the Families of Boston and Eastern Massachusetts, Vol. II (1908), pp. 1037-1038.
Arrington, Benjamin F.: Municipal History of Essex County in Massachusetts: A Classified Work, Devoted to the County's Remarkable Growth in All Lines of Human Endeavor; More Especially to Within a Period of Fifty Years (1922) p. 402.
Newhall, James Robinson.: History of Lynn Essex County, Massachusetts ; Including Lynnfield, Saugus, Swampscot, and Nahant: Massachusetts Including Lynnfield, Saugus, Swampscot, and Nahant Vol. II 1864 -1893. (1897) pp 354, 362.

External links
Mayors of the City of Lynn since its incorporation in 1850.  From the official website of the City of Lynn.
 

1837 births
1900 deaths
People from Northwood, New Hampshire
American Universalists
Republican Party members of the Massachusetts House of Representatives
Mayors of Lynn, Massachusetts
19th-century American politicians